Gong Seon-ok (born 1963) is a modern South Korean writer.

Life
Gong was born in Gokseong County, South Jeolla Province, South Korea. Her father, who abandoned the family early on, led a wandering existence in order to evade creditors, and her mother suffered from weak health. Although Gong was accepted into university, she was ultimately forced to leave because she could not afford the tuition and made a living by working as a factory hand and long-distance express bus attendant.

Work
Gong portrays traditional life in rural areas in reflection of her hometown in the southern Jeolla province Gong debuted in 1991 with her novella "Seeds of Fire." Gong's female characters reside at the bottom of the socioeconomic ladder, including the girl in "That’s Life," a squatter living in a freezing derelict apartment building without heat or electricity who ultimately loses her life in a butane gas accident.

The city of Gwangju is another reoccurring motif in Gong's work. Her husband is a survivor of the Gwangju uprising, a pro-democracy movement suppressed by the South Korean government in 1980. Gong lived not far from the scene of the protest and the university she briefly attended was also in Gwangju. Gong's debut work "Seeds of Fire" portrays the harrowing experience and resulting trauma of the men who had taken part in the Gwangju Democratization Movement. Her key works including the short stories "A Thirsty Season," "Alibi for the Next Season," and the novel When I Was Most Beautiful are also set in Gwangju. In her work, Gong portrays the sorrow and loss of Gwangju citizens who have personally experienced these atrocities.

Nevertheless, hope can still be found in Gong's work—not vague optimism, but hope in the fierce will of people who try to live cheerfully in the midst of pain.

Works in translation
 «Приходите на поле гаоляна» (Russian)
 《请到玉米地来》 (Chinese)
 "The Flowering of Our Lives" (in The Future of Silence: Fiction By Korean Women)
 "Wandering Family"
 "La familia itinerante" (Spanish)

Works in Korean (partial)
 My Thirties Left Behind in Oji-ri (1993)
 Bloom, Daffodil (1994)
 The Flowering of Our Lives (1994)
 Alibi for the Next Life (1998)
 A Wonderful World (2002)
 Come to the Sorghum Field (2002)
 Wandering Family (2005)
 Merrily Through the Night (2007)
 When I Was Most Beautiful (2009)
 Flowery Days (2011)

Awards
 Women News Literature Prize (1992)
 Shin Dongyeop Writing Award (1995)
 Today's Young Artist Award (2004)
 This Year's Literary Prize (Olhaemunhaksang 2005)
 Baek Sangae Literature Prize (2008)
 Manhae Literature Prize (2009)
 Oh Yeongsu Literature Prize (2009)
 Catholic Literature Prize (2009)
 Yosan Literature Prize (2011)

See also
Korean literature
List of Korean novelists

References 

1963 births
South Korean writers
Living people